Pfarrkirchen im Mühlkreis is a municipality in the district of Rohrbach in the Austrian state of Upper Austria.

Population

References

External links
 

Cities and towns in Rohrbach District